The 2017–18 EFL Cup was the 58th season of the EFL Cup. The competition was open to all 92 clubs participating in the Premier League and the English Football League. It was known as the Carabao Cup due to the start of a sponsorship deal with Carabao Energy Drinks after the tournament was unsponsored the previous year. The final took place at Wembley Stadium in London.

Manchester City won their fifth title after a 3–0 win over Arsenal in the final.	

Manchester United were the defending champions, but they were eliminated by Bristol City in the fifth round.

Access
All 92 clubs in the top four divisions of English football participate. In the first round, all the clubs in EFL League Two and EFL League One will enter alongside 22 of the 24 EFL Championship teams except for Hull City and Middlesbrough who received byes to the next round as the highest finishing teams relegated from the 2016–17 Premier League. In the second round, all Premier League clubs not involved in European competition enter. Arsenal, Chelsea,
Everton, Liverpool, Manchester City, Manchester United and Tottenham Hotspur all received byes to the third round owing to their participation in the UEFA Champions League and UEFA Europa League.

In June 2017, the English Football League announced that the draw for the first round of the competition would be held in Bangkok, Thailand, as a result of their new sponsorship deal with Thai company Carabao. There were plans for the 2017–18 EFL Cup to trial video assistant referees during matches in their first use in England. However the plans were scrapped due to a delay and would instead be trialled in the 2017–18 FA Cup from the third round instead.

Distribution
 Clubs involved in European competition entered at the third round.
 The remaining Premier League clubs and two Championship clubs who finished 18th and 19th in Premier League the previous season entered at the second round.
 The remaining English Football League clubs entered at the first round.

First round

Entry
A total of 70 clubs played in the first round: 24 from League Two (tier 4), 24 from League One (tier 3), and 22 from the Championship (tier 2). The draw for this round was split on a geographical basis into 'northern' and 'southern' sections. Teams were drawn against a team from the same section.

Matches
The first round draw was made as follows:

Northern section

Southern section

Note: The numbers in parentheses are the tier for the team during the 2017–18 season.

Second round

Entry
A total of 50 clubs played in the second round: 15 that entered in this round and the 35 winners from the first round. The 15 clubs entering this round were the 13 clubs from the 2017–18 Premier League not involved in any European competition, plus two clubs from the EFL Championship. The two clubs from the Championship are the two clubs that finished 18th and 19th in the 2016–17 Premier League. The draw for the second round was held on 10 August 2017 and was split on a geographical basis into 'northern' and 'southern' sections. Teams were drawn against a team from the same section.

Matches
The second round draw was made as follows:

Northern section

Southern section

Note: The numbers in parentheses are the tier for the team during the 2017–18 season.

Third round

Entry
A total of 32 clubs played in the third round: seven that entered in this round and the 25 winners from the second round. The clubs entering in this round were the seven from the 2017–18 Premier League involved in European competition. The draw for the third round was held on 24 August 2017.

Matches
The third round draw was made as follows:

Note: The numbers in parentheses are the tier for the team during the 2017–18 season.

Fourth round

Entry
A total of 16 clubs played in the fourth round, all winners from the third round. The draw for the fourth round was held on 20 September 2017.

Matches
The fourth round draw was made as follows:

Fifth round

Entry
A total of eight clubs played in the fifth round, all winners from the fourth round. The fifth round draw was held on 26 October 2017.

Matches

Semi-finals

Entry
A total of four clubs played in the semi-finals, all winners of the fifth round. There was no seeding in this round and the draw was held on 20 December at Ashton Gate immediately after Bristol City knocked out defending champions Manchester United in the 5th round.

Matches
The semi-finals were played over two legs, with each team playing one leg at home. The team that scored the most goals on aggregate over the two legs advanced to the final. If the aggregate score was level after 90 minutes in the second leg of a semi-final two 15-minute periods of extra time were played each way. If the aggregate score in a semi-final was still level at the end of extra time the tie was decided by the away goals rule, i.e. the team that scored most goals away from home over the two legs advanced. If a semi-final tie was still level, the result was determined by a penalty shoot-out.

The lowest ranked side to reach this stage of the competition was Championship club Bristol City.

First leg

Second leg

Final

The final was played on 25 February 2018 at Wembley Stadium.

Controversies regarding draws

There were a number of errors in the draw for the first round. Many fans experienced problems with the sound on the live stream from Thailand, and had to rely on the graphics. However, these contained a number of errors: Charlton Athletic were shown to be drawn in two ties, while a number of other teams including AFC Wimbledon, Brentford, Swindon Town, Norwich City, Forest Green Rovers, Wolverhampton Wanderers and Yeovil Town were all shown to have been given wrong draws. The English Football League later issued a statement apologising for the errors that had been made and stating that the draw had not been compromised with all clubs receiving confirmation of their ties.

Confusion also arose over the televised portion of the second round draw, in which four second round matches were announced with the incorrect location. The cup attracted even further criticism for its draws when it was announced that the third round draw would take place in Beijing at 11:15 China Standard Time (04:15 British Summer Time).

Further errors continued for the draw of the fifth round. This was due to technical problems at Twitter, which led to the draw being delayed for over an hour. The draw finally appeared in a pre-recorded video almost two hours late.

Top goalscorers

Notes

References

EFL Cup seasons
EFL Cup
EFL Cup
Cup